Cecil Lowell (19 November 1913 – 23 April 1989) was a South African cricketer. He played in seven first-class matches for Eastern Province between 1939/40 and 1950/51.

See also
 List of Eastern Province representative cricketers

References

External links
 

1913 births
1989 deaths
South African cricketers
Eastern Province cricketers
Cricketers from Johannesburg